"Remember You" is a song by American rapper Wiz Khalifa featuring Canadian singer the Weeknd, released as the second single from the former's fourth studio album, O.N.I.F.C.. Produced by Dpat and Illangelo, the song samples "Tell Me Do U Wanna" by Ginuwine. It was released on September 24, 2012, by Atlantic's YouTube channel.

Background
After delaying the album, Wiz Khalifa announced the second single of it, which is Remember You. He revealed the single's cover on his Twitter account, and it was later released on Atlantic's YouTube channel. In an interview with MTV News, Wiz Khalifa talked about the single stating it was a "beautiful idea of The Weeknd".

Composition
The song uses "bass-heavy, minimalist production", and finds the Weeknd asking his "one-night lover" to do something that will make him remember her ("All I ask of you is try to earn my memory / Make me remember you, like you remember me"). Wiz Khalifa begins rapping nearly two minutes into the song.

Music video
The official music video for the song was released on November 13, 2012, and directed by Ryan Hope. The video begins in a diner, where an "innocent-yet-curious" waitress and a woman with "blood-red lips, long dark hair and an even darker gaze" become attracted to each other. The two go out to a dark alley, exchanging kisses and an "erotic embrace" there. The waitress is taken to a "somewhat unusual and troublesome nighttime party" by the other woman, and is attracted to the "forbidden lifestyle" around the party. Wiz Khalifa briefly appears, rapping while he is tailored. The waitress stumbles around, before the clip ends with her crying on a bed as mascara runs down her face.

The Weeknd does not appear in the video.

Awards and nominations

Track listing 
Digital download
 "Remember You" – 4:50

Charts

Weekly charts

Year-end charts

Certifications

Radio and release history

References

2012 singles
2012 songs
Wiz Khalifa songs
The Weeknd songs
Atlantic Records singles
Songs written by Wiz Khalifa
Songs written by the Weeknd
Songs written by Timbaland
Songs written by Ginuwine
Songs written by Illangelo
Songs written by Belly (rapper)